("laughing corrects customs/manners") is a Latin phrase that generally means "one corrects customs by laughing at them," or "he corrects customs by ridicule." Some commentators suggest that the phrase embodies the essence of satire; in other words, the best way to change things is to point out their absurdity and laugh at them. French New Latin poet Abbé  (1630–1697) allegedly coined the phrase.

The phrase is often used to explain the idea of satire in works by Molière and Marivaux.

References

Latin philosophical phrases
Morality
Satire
Social change